Yanko Shopov (born 9 August 1954) is a Bulgarian wrestler. He competed at the 1976 Summer Olympics and the 1980 Summer Olympics.

References

External links
 

1954 births
Living people
Bulgarian male sport wrestlers
Olympic wrestlers of Bulgaria
Wrestlers at the 1976 Summer Olympics
Wrestlers at the 1980 Summer Olympics
People from Kotel, Bulgaria